Eugène Maës (15 September 1890 – 30 March 1945) was a French footballer who played as a striker.

Career
A young prodigy of the Lost Generation, Maës was the first true goalscorer for the France national team. With a great combat injury during World War I which obliged him to retire from professional football, Maës would certainly have been one of the best players for the tricolors, because in less than two years of his international career, he scored 15 goals in just 11 caps. His most glorious day remains 17 March 1912 in Turin, where, against Italy, after having arrived at 5 A.M., he scored a hat trick, and the French team defeated the Italians for the first time in their history, 4–3. The Red Star striker also holds another record with the blue shirt, thanks to the 5 goals he scored against Luxembourg in 1913, in an 8–0 victory. Only Thadée Cisowski would equal this accomplishment in 1956.

He was a reserve team member at the 1912 Summer Olympics but did not appear on the field.

During the Second World War, having been denounced to the Gestapo for anti-German remarks, Maës was deported in 1943 and died two years later in the Mittelbau-Dora concentration camp in Ellrich.

References

External links
 

1890 births
1945 deaths
French footballers
France international footballers
Association football forwards
Red Star F.C. players
French football managers
Stade Malherbe Caen managers
French military personnel of World War I
People who died in Mittelbau-Dora concentration camp
French people who died in Nazi concentration camps
French civilians killed in World War II